Orwell is a small, lazy-evaluation functional programming language implemented principally by Martin Raskovsky and first released in 1984 by Philip Wadler during his time as a Research Fellow in the Programming Research Group, part of the Oxford University Computing Laboratory. Developed as a free alternative to Miranda, it was a forerunner of Haskell and was one of the first programming languages to support list comprehensions and pattern matching.

The name is a tribute to George Orwell's novel Nineteen Eighty-Four, the year in which the programming language was released.  In the late 1980s and the 1990s, most of the computing practical assignments for undergraduates studying for a degree in Mathematics and Computation at Oxford University were required to be completed using the language.

References

Academic programming languages
Functional languages
Haskell programming language family
Programming languages created in 1984